Adnalı (also, Adnaly) is a village and municipality in the Shamakhi Rayon of Azerbaijan.  It has a population of 937.

References 

Populated places in Shamakhi District